Miguel Ángel Curiel Arteaga (born 8 March 1988) is a Peruvian professional footballer.

Honours

Club 
Sport Boys
 Peruvian Second Division: 2009
Alianza Lima
 Peruvian Reserve League: 2011

Individual 
 Peruvian Reserve League Top Scorer:  (1) 2011

References

External links

1988 births
Living people
Footballers from Lima
Association football forwards
Peruvian footballers
Peruvian expatriate footballers
Sport Boys footballers
Club Universitario de Deportes footballers
Alianza Atlético footballers
Club Alianza Lima footballers
Associação Ferroviária de Esportes players
Alfonso Ugarte de Puno players
Alianza Universidad footballers
Carlos A. Mannucci players
C.D. Águila footballers
Los Caimanes footballers
Unión Huaral footballers
Comerciantes Unidos footballers
Santiago Morning footballers
Cienciano footballers
Universidad Técnica de Cajamarca footballers
Primera B de Chile players
Peruvian Primera División players
Peruvian Segunda División players
Expatriate footballers in Brazil
Expatriate footballers in Chile
Peruvian expatriate sportspeople in Brazil
Peruvian expatriate sportspeople in Chile